Suki Kwan Sau Mei is a former Hong Kong model and actress; she has retired from the entertainment industry since 2005.

Life & Career

Early Days
Suki Kwan was born and raised in Hong Kong. She grew up at Kowloon Sau Mau Ping Estate and her mother was a greengrocer. Kwan attended the Hong Kong In-service Teacher Training Class Alumni Association School and North Point Concord Secondary School. After graduating from high school, she became a dance teacher.

TVB & Film Career
Suki signed on as a contract artist with TVB and made her debut in 1986. Kwan was a contestant in the 1987 Miss Hong Kong Pageant., but did not enter the final 12 nor won any awards. In 1987, Kwan became an actress in Hong Kong films. Kwan first appeared as Chu in The Romancing Star, a comedy film directed by Wong Jing. Her TVB contract was renewed in 1990 and ended in 1993. During that period, she participated in several TV series and joined Happy Tonight for three months. Although she had a lot of work, her stardom was not smooth. After leaving TVB, she switched to Debao and moved to the film industry, and later changed her contract to China Entertainment Company. In 1995, Suki temporarily withdrew from the show business for two years before returning in 1997.

Car Crash & Hiatus
In 2003, Suki was involved in a car crash and was sentenced for 14 days for the collision and attempting to deceive police. Suki was the intoxicated driver at the time, but after crashing her vehicle, she switched seats with her male friend. Police caught on the ruse and court proceedings sentenced her to detention for two weeks. After she was released, she told news reporters she has experienced a new perspective in life and took a year break from filming. She would return to film her final film before retiring from the entertainment industry.

Retirement
Kwan's last film was Colour of the Loyalty, a 2005 Triad film directed by Wong Jing and Billy Chung Siu-Hung. While she never publicly announced her retirement, she hasn't been featured in any media since 2005. Suki remains in Hong Kong, but maintains a low-key lifestyle. Despite being retired, she still occasionally appear in functions with celebrities she befriended during her career. She has been in a long-term relationship with Lei Wei Shuang and invested in her own business(es) to supplement her income. Kwan is credited with over 50 films.

Filmography

Films 
 1987 The Romancing Star - Chu
 1988 Operation Pink Squad - Shy Grass' partner.
 1989 Operation Pink Squad 2: The Hunted Tower - Policewoman.
 Miracles (1989)
 City Cops (1989)
 Love Is Love (1990)
 Heart Into Hearts (1990)
 Ghostly Vixen (1990)
 BB 30 (1990)
 His Fatal Ways (1991)
 Mr. Vampire 1992 (1992)
 Heart Against Hearts (1992)
 The Happy Massage Girls (1992)
 The Tale of a Heroine (1993)
 The Supreme Winner (1993) 
 Nobody Ever Cheats (1994)
 Drunken Master II (1994)
 Twist (1995)
 High Risk (1995)
 Passionate Nights (1997) - Joe-Fai's Sister 
 Your Place or Mine! (1998)
 A True Mob Story (1998)
 The Victim (1999)
 The Tricky Master (1999)
 Raped by an Angel 4: The Raper's Union (1999)
 Prince Charming (1999)
 Gigolo of Chinese Hollywood (1999)
 Crying Heart (1999)
 Century of the Dragon (1999)
 Sausalito (2000)
 Queen of Kowloon (2000)
 The Blood Rules (2000)
 A Gambler's Story (2001)
 Cop on a Mission (2001)
 The New Option (2002)
 The New Option - Run And Shoot (2002)
 The Irresistible Piggies (2002)
 The New Option - The Syndicate (2003)
 The New Option - The Revenge (2003)
 The New Option - The Final Showdown (2003)
 The New Option - The Campaign (2003)
 The New Option - Saviour (2003)
 The New Option - Puppet Hon (2003)
 The New Option - Gold Rush (2003)
 The New Option - Confrontation (2003)
 Colour of Loyalty (2005)

References

External links
 
 Hong Kong Cinemagic entry
 lovehkfilm entry

Hong Kong film actresses
1966 births
Living people